Giacomo Blason (born 19 March 1914 in Fiumicello; died 3 February 1998 in Monfalcone) was an Italian professional football player and coach who played as a goalkeeper.

Playing career
Blason played for 11 seasons (252 games) in the Serie A for U.S. Triestina Calcio, S.S. Lazio, S.S.C. Napoli and A.S. Roma.

Managing career
As a coach, Blason managed SPAL in the Serie A in the 1963–64 season.

1914 births
1998 deaths
Italian footballers
Serie A players
U.S. Triestina Calcio 1918 players
S.S. Lazio players
S.S.C. Napoli players
A.S. Roma players
Italian football managers
Serie A managers
S.P.A.L. managers
Association football goalkeepers
A.S. Pro Gorizia players